Dickens (renamed Uncovering the Real Dickens upon its DVD release) was a 2002 BBC docudrama on the life of the author Charles Dickens.  It was presented by Peter Ackroyd, on whose biography of Dickens it was based, and Dickens was played by Anton Lesser.  It was broadcast in three hour-long episodes.

References

External links
Official website at PBS
 

2002 British television series debuts
2002 British television series endings
2000s British drama television series
Works about Charles Dickens
BBC television docudramas
2000s British television miniseries
English-language television shows